Helen Lieros (3 August 1940 – 14 July 2021) was a Zimbabwean visual artist. She was born in Gweru, Zimbabwe to Greek parents. She studied at the Ecole des Beaux-Arts and the Centre Contemporaine de la Gravure (now the ) in Geneva, Switzerland. She also spent time at the in Florence, Italy. After wandering in Europe, Lieros returned to Zimbabwe (then Rhodesia) in 1964 and took up a position as a teacher at Chaplin High School, where she had been a student. She moved to Harare (then Salisbury) in 1967, where she lived until her death on 14 July 2021.

Career 
Lieros is one of Zimbabwe's most illustrious artists and had a career that spanned across six decades. She established Gallery Delta in Harare with her husband Derek Huggins in 1975. The independent space has been involved in the curation, organisation, presentation and promotion of approximately five-hundred exhibitions. Besides being invested in her own practice, Lieros and her husband dedicated most of their career teaching and mentoring generations of Zimbabwean painters. These include Berry Bickle, Greg Shaw, Lovemore Kambudzi, Cosmas Shiridzinonwa, Gina Maxim, Misheck Masamvu, Admire Kamudzengerere, Richard Mudariki, and many others. In early 2021, Lieros was honored by the National Arts Council of Zimbabwe as a National Merits Awards Legend.

Exhibitions (solo) 

 1966 Naikes’ Gallery, Bulawayo.
 1968 Polworth's Galleries, Harare.
 1970 Barbour's Gallery, Harare.
 1970 Stoa Texnis Gallery, Athens.
 1972/75 Tara Arts & Seven Arts, Harare.
 1973 Diogenes International Galleries, Athens.
 1979 Exhibition, Gallery Delta, Harare.
 1983 Selected works, PG Gallery, National Gallery of Zimbabwe, Harare.
 1985 Galerie Chausse Coqs, Geneva.
 1991 Major Retrospective Exhibition, National Gallery of Zimbabwe, Harare.
 1995 Diary of an Inheritance Gallery Delta, Harare.
 1995 Antithesis, Mayfair Gallery, London.
 1998 Logos – The Word Gallery Delta, Harare.
 2004 Retrospective Exhibition – a selection of paintings and graphics over three decades 1974 -2004, Gallery Delta, Harare.
 2004 Diaspora Municipal Gallery of Kallithea (Δημοτική Πινακοθήκη Καλλιθέας), Greece.
 2005 Aeons National Gallery of Zimbabwe.
 2007 Antithesis Municipal Gallery of Kallithea, Greece.

References

1940 births
2021 deaths
20th-century Zimbabwean women artists
21st-century Zimbabwean women artists
People from Gweru
École des Beaux-Arts alumni
White Zimbabwean people
Zimbabwean people of Greek descent